Pallikkal is a village in Adoor taluk, Pathanamthitta district in the state of Kerala, India.

References

Villages in Pathanamthitta district